The 2022 St Kilda Football Club season is the 124th competing in the VFL/AFL and 138th in the club's history. Coached by Brett Ratten and captained by Jack Steele, they are competing in the AFL's 2022 Premiership Season.

Background

Squad changes

Retirements and delistings 

Three retirees were announced in the days following St Kilda's final game of 2021, while Dylan Roberton had announced his retirement in January. While the Saints' lost 612 games of experience, combined the retirees only managed 10 games in 2021.

Trade period

Delisted free agency period 

Former North Melbourne and Western Bulldogs ruckman Tom Campbell joined the Saints as a delisted free agent on 5 November 2021.

National draft

Category B rookie selections

Pre-season supplemental selection period

Coaching staff changes 

In:
 Corey Enright (Defence)
Nick Walsh (High Performance Manager)
Damian Carroll (Head of Development and Learning)
Ernie Merrick (Senior Coach Mentor)

Out:
 Aaron Hamill (Defence)
 Adam Skrobalak (Forwards)
 Matt Hornsby (High Performance Manager)
 Andrew Wallis (Senior Physio)

Pre-season

Practice matches 
A practice match against Carlton at Princes Park was confirmed on 7 February 2022 to be played a fortnight later in preparation for the home and away season.

Premiership season

League table

Result by round

Matches 

The fixture for the 2022 season was released on 9 December 2021, with only the first nine rounds released with dates and times for each match. The remainder of the fixture from round 10 was left as a floating fixture so as to prioritize the best matches for each round in prime-time slots, and dates were released progressively through the year.

Players and staff

Playing and coaching staff list
The playing squad and coaching staff of the St Kilda Football Club for the 2022 AFL season as of 8 August 2022.

Player selection and availability 
Team selection of the St Kilda Football Club for the 2022 AFL season as of 29 May 2022.

Legend: x - selected; m - selected as the medical substitute; e - selected as an emergency; i - unavailable due to injury; s - unavailable due to suspension; p- unavailable due to personal leave; c- unavailable due to Health and Safety Protocols (COVID-19);  blank - available but did not play

References

External links
 
 Listing of St Kilda games in 2022

St Kilda Football Club seasons
St Kilda
St Kilda